Honour Thy Mother is a 1928 German silent film directed by Paul L. Stein and starring Mary Carr, Walter Rilla and Anita Dorris.

The film's sets were designed by the art director Leopold Blonder. It was made by the German subsidiary of First National Pictures.

Cast
 Mary Carr as Die Mutter  
 Walter Rilla as Fritz - ihr Sohn 
 Anita Dorris as Erna - die Nichte  
 Jakob Tiedtke as Theodor Krause  
 Max Gülstorff as Dr. Heim  
 Leopold Kramer as Professor Meingart  
 Valerie Boothby as Elise - seine Tochter

References

External links

1928 films
Films of the Weimar Republic
Films directed by Paul L. Stein
German silent feature films
German black-and-white films